Brockenbrough is a surname. Notable people with the surname include:

John Brockenbrough (1775–1852), business man and civic leader in Richmond, Virginia
John M. Brockenbrough (1830–1892), farmer and a Confederate colonel in the American Civil War
John White Brockenbrough (1806–1877), Virginia lawyer, federal judge, and educator
Judith Brockenbrough (1784–1854), intimate of Dolley Madison, wife of U.S. President James Madison
Martha Brockenbrough, American author of fiction and nonfiction for children and adults
William Brockenbrough (jurist) (1778–1838), born in Tappahannock in Essex County, Virginia, USA
William Henry Brockenbrough (1812–1850), US Representative from Florida

See also
Brackenber
Brackenbury
Brokenborough
Brückenberg